Mount Kyle is a mountain,  high, midway along the ridge bordering the north side of Deming Glacier, in the Admiralty Mountains of Antarctica. It was mapped by the United States Geological Survey from surveys and U.S. Navy air photos, 1960–63, and was named by the Advisory Committee on Antarctic Names for Ricky L. Kyle, U.S. Navy, a Utilitiesman at McMurdo Station, 1967.

References

Mountains of Victoria Land
Borchgrevink Coast